The 2003 BYU Cougars football team represented Brigham Young University during the 2003 NCAA Division I-A football season.

Schedule

•SportsWest Productions (SWP) games were shown locally on KSL 5.

Roster

BYU Cougars Radio Network
The BYU Cougars radio network carried every game on radio using the broadcast trio of Greg Wrubell (pxp), Marc Lyons (analyst), and Bill Riley (sidelines). KSL 1160 AM served as the flagship station for BYU Football.

Game summaries

Georgia Tech

USC

New Mexico

Source:

Stanford

Air Force

San Diego State

Source:

Colorado State

Wyoming

Source:

UNLV

Boise State

Notre Dame

Utah

Source:

References

BYU
BYU Cougars football seasons
BYU Cougars football